Tanglewood is a historic plantation house in Akron, Alabama. The Greek Revival cottage was built in 1859 by Page Harris, on land that he had purchased in 1824.  It was given to the University of Alabama as a memorial to Nicholene Bishop in 1949 and the grounds are now used as a  nature reserve known as the J. Nicholene Bishop Biological Station.  It is used by the university to aid undergraduate and graduate research in biodiversity and environmental processes.  The house was added to the National Register of Historic Places on April 11, 1973, due to its architectural significance.

References

External links

 

National Register of Historic Places in Hale County, Alabama
Houses on the National Register of Historic Places in Alabama
Houses completed in 1859
Plantation houses in Alabama
Greek Revival houses in Alabama
Houses in Hale County, Alabama
Historic American Buildings Survey in Alabama